Tupong is a state constituency in Sarawak, Malaysia, that has been represented in the Sarawak State Legislative Assembly since 1991.

The state constituency was created in the 1987 redistribution and is mandated to return a single member to the Sarawak State Legislative Assembly under the first past the post voting system. It has amongst the highest concentrations of Malay-Muslim middle-class voters in Sarawak, and consists largely of low-density residential areas with emerging commercial zones. It comprises part of a ring of the most affluent Malay-majority areas in Sarawak, which are representative of Malay, middle-class, urban settings.

History
2006–2016: The constituency contains the polling districts of Tupong, Gita, Segedup, Sungai Tengah, Rahmat, Sinjan, Sejoli, Paroh, Matang.

2016–present: The constituency contains the polling districts of Tupong, Gita, Sungai Tengah, Rahmat, Sinjan, Sejoli, Paroh, Matang, Sri Wangi.

Representation history

Election results

References

Sarawak state constituencies